Filler text (also placeholder text or dummy text) is text that shares some characteristics of a real written text, but is random or otherwise generated. It may be used to display a sample of fonts, generate text for testing, or to spoof an e-mail spam filter. The process of using filler text is sometimes called greeking, although the text itself may be nonsense, or largely Latin, as in Lorem ipsum.

Asdf
ASDF is the sequence of letters that appear on the first four keys on the home row of a QWERTY or QWERTZ keyboard. They are often used as a sample or test case or as random, meaningless nonsense. It is also a common learning tool for keyboard classes, since all four keys are located on Home row.

Etaoin shrdlu

"Etaoin shrdlu" is the approximate order of frequency of the twelve most commonly used letters in the English language, best known as a nonsense phrase that sometimes appeared in print in the days of "hot type" publishing due to a custom of Linotype machine operators.

Lorem ipsum

"Lorem ipsum..." is one of the most common filler texts, popular with typesetters and graphic designers. "Li Europan lingues..." is another similar example.

Now is the time for all good men
"Now is the time for all good men to come to the aid of the party" is a phrase first proposed as a typing drill by instructor Charles E. Weller; its use is recounted in his book The Early History of the Typewriter, p. 21 (1918).  Frank E. McGurrin, an expert on the early Remington typewriter, used it in demonstrating his touch typing abilities in January 1889. It has appeared in a number of typing books, often in the form "Now is the time for all good men to come to the aid of their country."

The quick brown fox jumps over the lazy dog

A coherent, short phrase that uses every letter of the English alphabet. See pangram for more examples.

New Petitions and Building Code
Many B movies of the 1940s, 50s, and 60s utilized the "spinning newspaper" effect to narrate important plot points that occurred offscreen. The effect necessitated the appearance of a realistic front page, which consisted of a main headline relevant to the plot, and several smaller headlines used as filler. A large number of these spinning newspapers included stories titled "New Petitions Against Tax" and "Building Code Under Fire." These phrases have become running jokes among B movie fans, and particularly fans of Mystery Science Theater 3000.

Character Generator Protocol

The Character Generator Protocol (CHARGEN) service is an Internet protocol intended for testing, debugging, and measurement purposes.
!"#$%&'()*+,-./0123456789:;<=>?@ABCDEFGHIJKLMNOPQRSTUVWXYZ[\]^_`abcdefgh
"#$%&'()*+,-./0123456789:;<=>?@ABCDEFGHIJKLMNOPQRSTUVWXYZ[\]^_`abcdefghi
#$%&'()*+,-./0123456789:;<=>?@ABCDEFGHIJKLMNOPQRSTUVWXYZ[\]^_`abcdefghij
$%&'()*+,-./0123456789:;<=>?@ABCDEFGHIJKLMNOPQRSTUVWXYZ[\]^_`abcdefghijk

Unicode replacement character

The Unicode replacement character is a placeholder symbol used to replace missing text if a letter cannot be typed. For example, a missing "O" in "Hop" would be written as H�p, and a missing "E" in "Hello" would be written as H�llo.

See also
Sample text in Microsoft Word
Postmodernism Generator
The quick brown fox jumps over the lazy dog
 Lorem ipsum
 Hamburgevons

References

 
Typography